The 1991 Campeonato Argentino de Rugby  was won by the selection of  Buenos Aires that beat in the final the selection of Rosario.

Rugby union in Argentina in 1991

National
 The Buenos Aires Champsionship was won by Alumni
 The Cordoba Province Championship was won by La Tablada
 The North-East Championship was won by Tucumán RC

International
 In order to prepare the 1991 Rugby World Cup Argentina, host the la New Zealand team in tour. Both test-match was easily won by All Blacks (14-28) and (6-36), that won all the matches against provincial selection.

 At the 1991 Rugby World Cup, Argentina lost al the matches against Wales, Samoa and Australia.
 Few days before the Rugby World Cup, Argentina won, with the second line players, the South American Championship.

"Campeonato" Tournament 
The better eight teams played for title. They were divided in two pools of four, the first two each pools admitted to semifinals, the last relegated in secondo division
Pool A.

Pool A

Pool B

Semifinals

3rd place final

Final 

 Champions: Tucumán
 Relegated : Mar del Plata and Misiones

Torneo "Ascenso" 
Eight team divided in two pools, the winner of each promoted, the last relegated

Pool "A" 

Promoted: Santa Fè
Relegated: Santiago del estero

Pool B 

Promoted: Entre Rios
Relegated: Oeste

Torneo "Clasificacion" 

Was played for the first time a "Third level" tournament, with a promotion in "Ascenso"

Pool A 
The tournament was cancelled

Pool B 

Promoted: Centro

External links 
 Memorias de la UAR 1991
  Francesco Volpe, Paolo Pacitti (Author), Rugby 2000, GTE Gruppo Editorale (1999)

Campeonato Argentino de Rugby
Argentina